Sir William Carew, 5th Baronet (c. 1690–1744) was a British politician who sat in the House of Commons from 1711 to 1744.

Carew was the second son of Sir John Carew, 3rd Baronet and his third wife Mary Morice, daughter of Sir William Morice, 1st Baronet   of Werrington, Devon.and was baptized on 24 January 1690. He succeeded his elder brother in the baronetcy on 24 September 1703.  He matriculated at Exeter College, Oxford on 4 September 1707 aged 18.

On 5 January 1714, Carew married  Lady Anne Coventry, daughter of Gilbert Coventry, 4th Earl of Coventry. She was an heiress, and he then had work started on Antony House in Cornwall.

Carew was returned as Member of Parliament for Saltash at a by-election on 17 January 1711. At the 1713 general election he was returned instead as MP for  Cornwall.  He was re-elected MP for Cornwall in the general elections of   1715, 1722,   1727,    1734 and  1741.
 
Carew died on 8 March 1744. He was succeeded in the baronetcy by his son  Coventry.

References

1690s births
1744 deaths
British MPs 1710–1713
British MPs 1713–1715
British MPs 1715–1722
British MPs 1722–1727
British MPs 1727–1734
British MPs 1734–1741
British MPs 1741–1747
Members of the Parliament of Great Britain for English constituencies
Baronets in the Baronetage of England
Carew baronets